Fauntleroy is a surname. Notable people with the surname include:

Archibald Magill Fauntleroy (1837–1886), American physician
Cedric Fauntleroy (1891–1973), American pilot
Don E. Fauntleroy (born 1953), American cinematographer and film director
Henry Fauntleroy (1784–1824), English banker and forger
James Fauntleroy, American musician and songwriter
Thomas T. Fauntleroy (soldier) (1796–1883), American soldier
Thomas T. Fauntleroy (lawyer) (1823–1894), American lawyer
William Fauntleroy, 16th-century English clergyman